KF Skënderbeu Poroj is a football club based in the village of Poroj, Tetovo, North Macedonia. They recently competed in the Macedonian Third League.

History
The club was founded in 1993.

References

External links
Skënderbeu Poroj Facebook 
Club info at MacedonianFootball 
Football Federation of Macedonia 

Skenderbeu Poroj
Skenderbeu Poroj
Association football clubs established in 1993
1993 establishments in the Republic of Macedonia
FK